The Remington Model 660 is a bolt-action rifle manufactured by Remington Arms from 1968 to 1971. The rifle was intended as a replacement for the Model 600.

History
The Model 660 emerged from the success of the Model 600, which was originally produced from 1964 to 1967. In 1968, the Model 660 was introduced as a redesign of the Model 600. Main changes included elimination of the ventilated rib and a  increase in the length of the barrel. After 3 years, the M660 was discontinued and the Model 600 Mohawk was introduced.

Variants
Model 660 Magnum
Same specs as the standard model except featuring a laminated walnut stock for added strength. It also featured quick detachable sling swivels and a recoil pad.

Recall
The Model 660, along with many Model 600s was affected by a recall in 1979 to remedy a problem with the bolt lock safety that under certain circumstances allowed accidental discharge. https://www.remington.com/support/safety-center/safety-modification-program/remington-model-600-660

References

External links 
 

Remington Arms firearms
Bolt-action rifles of the United States